Bharathi Matriculation Higher Secondary School is a senior high school in  Kallakurichi, Tamil Nadu, India.

Location 

High schools and secondary schools in Tamil Nadu
Education in Viluppuram district